Zamil is a surname. Notable people with the surname include:

Adil Zamil Abdull Mohssin Al Zamil, citizen of Kuwait held in extrajudicial detention in the US Guantanamo Bay detention camps in Cuba
Ahmad Zamil (born 1978), one of the finalists in the Malaysian reality talent show Malaysian Idol in 2004
Muqrin ibn Zamil, ruler of eastern Arabia, including al-Hasa, al-Qatif, Bahrain; the last Jabrid ruler of Bahrain